Grumpy means unhappy, dissatisfied or irritable. 

It may refer to:

Grumpy, one of the Seven Dwarfs in some adaptations of the fairy tale Snow White
Grumpy (1923 film), a silent drama
Grumpy (1930 film), a remake of the 1923 film
Grumpy, a nickname of the drag racer Bill Jenkins
Grumpy Cat, (2012-2019), American Internet celebrity cat
Grumpy, a dinosaur character from the 1974 television series Land of the
 Lost
Grumpy Bear, a character from the cartoon the Care Bears
Mr. Grumpy, title character of a novel in the Mr. Men children's book series

See also 
 Grump (disambiguation)